Gacyclidine (GK-11, OTO-313) is a psychoactive drug which acts as a dissociative via functioning as a non-competitive NMDA receptor antagonist. It is closely related to phencyclidine (PCP), and specifically, is a derivative of tenocyclidine (TCP).

History 
Gacyclidine is a psychoactive drug that was used for helping with body trauma in humans. While seeing most tests on animals, it was never used commercially to the degree as other painkillers or psychoactive drugs. While Gacyclidine has been used in numerous tests dating back to 2012, these tests did not provide fruitful results that would push the future of the drug into a different direction.

Chemistry

The 1,2-addition of  2-methylcyclohexanone (I) with 2-thienyl lithium (II) or 2-thienyl magnesium bromide (III) gives cyclohexanol (IV) as a diastereomeric mixture, which was treated with sodium azide (NaN3) in trichloroacetic acid to yield the azide (V). The reduction of (V) with lithium aluminium hydride (LiAlH4) or Raney nickel in isopropanol affords the corresponding amine (VI), preferentially with the cis-configuration. Finally, this compound is dialkylated with 1,5-dibromopentane (VII) by means of potassium carbonate (K2CO3) in acetonitrile to provide the target compound as a diastereomeric mixture.

Usage

Main 
Gacyclidine's original purpose was for helping with human body trauma, specifically spine and brain trauma. Tests were done on animals to see how their bodies would react to the different drugs and see how that information could be applied to humans. Gacyclidine is used to reduce damage to the brain or spinal cord, hence a treatment for tinnitus, stroke, trauma, and convulsion. As a psychoactive drug, alteration of perception is what makes this substance of use. The use of this product derives in medical usage.  It is recommended that the prescriptive drug be used before such injuries, but it could be of use after the injury has occurred. A lipid-based intratympanic formulation of gacyclidine (OTO-313) has been studied as an potential therapy for the treatment of tinnitus.

Dosage 
Testing of Gacyclidine was performed on animals in a study. In concluding hours (18-96 h) no necrotic neurons were discovered in animals with dosages of 1, 5, 10, 20 milligrams of Gacyclidine. At 20 milligrams the presence of a few cytoplasmic vacuoles were present. In a study conducted to find possible neurotoxicity in dosages, scientists tested the effects of Gacyclidine in comparison to MK-801 (dizocilpine) and CNS-1102, and finalized more positive effects on animals from Gacyclidine. When given MK-801 at dosages of 1 or 5 milligrams of Gacyclidine, effects were harmless and behaved similarly to untreated animals. At dosages between 5 and 10 milligrams, the animals began to experience behaviors of tremors, sedation and exophthalmos. With CNS-1102, at all doses tested, the animals exhibited some excitation. At the highest doses (10 and 20 milligrams) they suffered from severe akinesia 1 hour after drug administration. Animals that received 1 or 5 milligrams of Gacyclidine or its enantiomers behave similarly to untreated animals. At the highest doses (10 and 20 milligrams), the animals began to show some signs of excitation. For all doses, the recovery period was always better with Gacyclidine and its enantiomers than with MK-801 or CNS-1102. The days after the testing, labs observed electron microscopy in the 20-milligram group. During observation small lesions were labeled as cytoplasmic or intramitochondrial vacuoles. In addition, no neuronal or glial alterations, such as astrocytic swelling or microglial activation, were seen that could suggest a short-term toxic event had occurred. Further concluding observations, current evidence indicates that the possibility of a short-term toxicity, would be totally reversible. Likewise, any long-term toxicity would become evident after 4 days. But, the evidence in total strongly suggests that Gacyclidine and its enantiomers are, at least, far less neurotoxic than MK-801.

Effect 
With the use of this drug, motor skills have significantly improved upon use, as it is the antagonist to the NMDA receptor. Gacyclidine is able to reduce calcium getting into cells. While animal test results showed potential in the rats, human tests showed slight improvement to the condition of patients. Outside of results seen in animals like potential trauma assistance and pain relief, there is little to no proof that there will be any clinical benefits in the future of Gacyclidine.

Ethics 
The results of Gacyclidine are helpful in reducing the size of the lesion and enhancing the functional parameters after injury. Gacyclidine also increases behavioral parameters and neuronal survival in traumatic brain injury models. When gacyclidine is administered 0 to 30 minutes after injury, optimum protection is obtained. It is therefore concluded that Gacyclidine exhibits neuroprotective effects close to those of other antagonists of the NMDA receptor, with the benefit of being slightly less neuroprotective.

Gacyclidine being a psychoactive drug and its chemical makeup have the potential to become a very addictive drug when combined in certain formulas. This resulted in Gacyclidine falling under the list of drugs that were placed under the Controlled Substances Act which sought to control the distribution of certain drugs such psychoactive drugs, depressants, and narcotics.

See also 
 Arylcyclohexylamine
 Memantine
 Dextrallorphan
 Dimemorfan

References

External links 
 

Arylcyclohexylamines
Dissociative drugs
NMDA receptor antagonists
Thiophenes
1-Piperidinyl compounds